Massinet Sorcinelli (February 27, 1922 in São Paulo – August 12, 1971) was a Brazilian basketball player who competed in the 1948 Summer Olympics in London, United Kingdom. There he won the bronze medal with the men's national basketball team under the guidance of head coach Moacyr Daiuto.

References

External links
profile
 Profile

1922 births
1971 deaths
Basketball players from São Paulo
Brazilian men's basketball players
Olympic basketball players of Brazil
Basketball players at the 1948 Summer Olympics
Basketball players at the 1951 Pan American Games
Olympic bronze medalists for Brazil
Olympic medalists in basketball
Medalists at the 1948 Summer Olympics
Pan American Games bronze medalists for Brazil
Pan American Games medalists in basketball
Medalists at the 1951 Pan American Games